Wanda Ramos (1948–1998) was a Portuguese author and poet.

Ramos was born in Dundo, Angola and moved to Portugal around 1958. In addition to her novels and collections of poems, Ramos also worked as a translator, translating works by Jorge Luis Borges, Edith Wharton, Octavio Paz, Rabindranath Tagore and John le Carré into Portuguese.

Selected works
Collections of poems 
 Nas Coxas do Tempo (1970)
 E Contudo Cantar Sempre (1979)
 Poemas-com-Sentidos (1985)

Novels
 Percursos (1981), which won the prize for fiction of the Portuguese Writers' Association
 As Incontáveis Vésperas (1983)
 l'éblouissant Litoral (1991)
Her last book was Crónica com estuário ao fundo, (French version Chronique sur fond d’estuaire) published in 1998.

References 

1948 births
1998 deaths
20th-century Portuguese poets
Portuguese novelists
Portuguese translators
Angolan women writers
Portuguese women novelists
Portuguese women poets
20th-century Portuguese women writers
20th-century translators
20th-century novelists